Christopher Matthew Rahming (born 27 April 1999) is a Bahamian footballer who plays for Castellaneta Calcio 1926 and the Bahamas national football team. Chris is also a member of the I2I Soccer Academy in the UK.

International career
Rahming made his senior international debut on 7 September 2018 in a 4–0 away defeat to Belize during CONCACAF Nations League qualifying.

References

External links

Profile at Jefferson University

1999 births
Living people
Bahamian footballers
Bahamas international footballers
Association football midfielders
Sportspeople from Nassau, Bahamas